Kevin Martin (born 1957) is an American dancer, ballet teacher, and former ballet master of the Nutmeg Ballet Conservatory.

Early life
Martin was born to Robert and Jane Martin, and was one of eight children. He also has a twin brother. He started dancing at the age of 8 at Hickory Dance under the tutelage of Louis Nunnery.  At the age of 15, Martin became the youngest lead dancer in the outdoor drama, Unto These Hills for three consecutive years.

Career
After graduation from Hickory High School in 1975, Martin went to New York to study with John Barker at the John Barker School of Classical Ballet. He studied with John Barker for six years. Martin competed in the 1981 Moscow International Ballet Competition (Международный конкурс артистов балета и хореографов) in Moscow, Russia. After training with Barker, Martin danced with Ballet Mississippi.  He then danced with Texas Tech Ballet, and subsequently with the Washington Ballet in 1985.  Martin later became the Director of the men's division of the Nutmeg Ballet in Torrington, Connecticut for many years.

References

External links
 Kevin Martin being coached by Erik Bruhn 

20th-century American ballet dancers
1957 births
Living people